Resket or Raskat may refer to:
 Resket-e Olya
 Resket-e Sofla